Colobothea picturata is a species of beetle in the family Cerambycidae. It was described by Monné in 1993. It is known from Venezuela.

References

picturata
Beetles described in 1993